Extended Versions is a live album by Ringo Starr & His All-Starr Band released by BMG on 1 April 2003. The album features the tracks from the All-Starr Band's 2001 tour.  (Tracks from the 2001 edition of the All-Starr Band also appeared on the album, King Biscuit Flower Hour Presents Ringo & His New All-Starr Band, released in 2002).

Track listing

Personnel 
Ringo Starr & His All-Starr Band
Ringo Starr – drums, percussion, vocals
Roger Hodgson – guitars, vocals
Ian Hunter – guitars, keyboards, vocals
Greg Lake – bass guitar, vocals
Howard Jones – keyboards, vocals
Sheila E. – drums, percussion, vocals
Mark Rivera – saxophone, flute, guitar, bass guitar, percussion, harmonica, vocals

References
 Footnotes

 Citations

2003 live albums
Ringo Starr live albums
Ringo Starr & His All-Starr Band albums